Contours is the second album by American saxophonist Sam Rivers recorded in 1965 and released on the Blue Note label. The CD reissue contains an alternate take as a bonus track.

Reception
The Allmusic review by Stephen Thomas Erlewine awarded the album 5 stars and stated "On Contours, his second Blue Note album, tenor saxophonist Sam Rivers fully embraced the avant-garde, but presented his music in a way that wouldn't be upsetting or confusing to hard bop loyalists...

Track listing
All compositions by Sam Rivers.

 "Point of Many Returns" - 9:20
 "Dance of the Tripedal" - 10:07
 "Euterpe" - 11:43
 "Mellifluous Cacophony" - 8:58
 "Mellifluous Cacophony" [Alternate Take] - 9:04 Bonus track on CD reissue

Personnel
Sam Rivers - tenor saxophone, soprano saxophone, flute
Freddie Hubbard - trumpet
Herbie Hancock - piano
Ron Carter - bass
Joe Chambers - drums

References

Blue Note Records albums
Sam Rivers (jazz musician) albums
1967 albums
Albums recorded at Van Gelder Studio
Albums produced by Alfred Lion